Auratonota cubana is a species of moth of the family Tortricidae. It is found in Cuba.

The wingspan is 18–19 mm. The ground colour of the forewings is glossy white near the markings and distinctly suffused ochreous or yellowish brown in the median areas. The markings are brownish ochreous and the median fasciae are yellowish brown. The dorsal area and the area along the basal half of the costa is brown. The hindwings are brownish, but darker on the margins.

References

Moths described in 2000
Auratonota
Moths of the Caribbean
Endemic fauna of Cuba